Sonia Mendoza Díaz (born 22 February 1969) is a Mexican politician affiliated with the Ecologist Green Party of Mexico (PVEM). She currently serves as a federal deputy in the LXV Legislature of the Mexican Congress from the state of San Luis Potosí. She previously was a senator of the LXII and LXIII Legislatures, a federal deputy during the LXI Legislature and a local deputy in the LVIII Legislature of the Congress of San Luis Potosí, all while with the National Action Party.

References

1969 births
Living people
Politicians from San Luis Potosí
Members of the Senate of the Republic (Mexico) for San Luis Potosí
Members of the Chamber of Deputies (Mexico) for San Luis Potosí
National Action Party (Mexico) politicians
21st-century Mexican politicians
21st-century Mexican women politicians
People from Matehuala
Universidad Autónoma de San Luis Potosí alumni
Members of the Congress of San Luis Potosí
Senators of the LXII and LXIII Legislatures of Mexico
Deputies of the LXI Legislature of Mexico
Ecologist Green Party of Mexico politicians
Deputies of the LXV Legislature of Mexico
Women members of the Chamber of Deputies (Mexico)
Women members of the Senate of the Republic (Mexico)